Oliver Lyman Spaulding (August 2, 1833 – July 30, 1922) was a soldier and politician from the U.S. state of Michigan.

Early life and education
Spaulding was born in Jaffrey, New Hampshire on August 2, 1833.  He completed preparatory studies, graduated from Oberlin College of Ohio in 1855, and moved to Michigan where he taught school.  He studied law, was admitted to the bar in 1858 and commenced practice in St. Johns, Michigan. He was regent of the University of Michigan at Ann Arbor from 1858 to 1864.

Career
During the Civil War, Spaulding served in the Union Army as a captain in the 23rd Michigan Infantry Regiment. He eventually was promoted to Colonel and later was brevetted  Brigadier General. Afterwards he resumed the practice of law in St. Johns.

Spaulding served as Michigan Secretary of State from 1866 to 1870. Afterwards, he became a member of the Republican State committee from 1871 to 1878.  He declined the position of United States district judge of the Utah Territory in 1871 and later served as special agent of the United States Treasury Department from 1875 to 1881.

Spaulding was elected as a Republican from Michigan's 6th congressional district to the 46th Congress serving from March 4, 1881 to March 3, 1883.  He was an unsuccessful candidate for reelection in 1882. He also served as chairman of the commission sent to the Sandwich Islands to investigate alleged violations of the Hawaiian reciprocity treaty in 1883.

Oliver Spaulding again served as a special agent of the United States Treasury in 1885, 1889, and 1890 and then as Assistant U.S. Secretary of the Treasury from 1890 to 1893 during the Benjamin Harrison administration and 1897 to 1903 during the McKinley administration. He was also president of the first International American Customs Congress, held in New York City in January 1903 and again a special agent of the United States Treasury from 1903 to 1909 and then customs agent from 1909 to 1916.

Personal life
He married Mary Cecilia Swegles on August 12, 1862. Their son, Oliver Lyman Spaulding, served as a brigadier general during World War I.

Death and legacy
Oliver L. Spaulding died in Washington, D.C., and is buried at Arlington National Cemetery, in Arlington, Virginia.

References

External links
 Retrieved on 2008-02-15
 The Political Graveyard

1833 births
1922 deaths
Oberlin College alumni
Union Army colonels
Regents of the University of Michigan
Secretaries of State of Michigan
Burials at Arlington National Cemetery
Republican Party members of the United States House of Representatives from Michigan
People from Jaffrey, New Hampshire
People from St. Johns, Michigan
19th-century American politicians
Military personnel from Michigan